Javid Taghiyev (born on 22 July 1992) is an Azerbaijani professional footballer who plays as a midfielder for Azerbaijan Premier League side Sabah FK.

Playing career

Club
In June 2014, Taghiyev moved from AZAL to Qarabağ.

On 30 August 2016, Taghiyev signed a two-year contract with Zira FK.

On 31 May 2019, Taghiyev signed a two-year contract with Sabah FK.

Career statistics

Club

International

Statistics accurate as of match played 26 March 2016
|}

Honours

Club
Qarabağ
 Azerbaijan Premier League: (2) 2014-15, 2015–16
 Azerbaijan Cup: (2) 2014-15, 2015-16

References

External links
 

1992 births
Living people
Association football midfielders
Azerbaijani footballers
Azerbaijan under-21 international footballers
Azerbaijan international footballers
Azerbaijan Premier League players
Turan-Tovuz IK players
AZAL PFK players
Qarabağ FK players
Zira FK players
Sumgayit FK players
Sabah FC (Azerbaijan) players
People from Tovuz